Millbrook  may refer to:

Geographic places

Australia
 Millbrook, Victoria

Canada
 Millbrook First Nation, including the community Millbrook 27, Nova Scotia
 Millbrook, Ontario

New Zealand
 Millbrook Resort, a luxury resort near Queenstown

United Kingdom
 Millbrook, Bedfordshire, a village
Home to the Millbrook Proving Ground
 Millbrook, Cornwall, a village
Home to Millbrook AFC, who play at Jenkins Park
 Millbrook, Axminster, an area of Axminster, Devon
 Millbrook, North Molton, a location in Devon
 Millbrook, Greater Manchester, an area of Stalybridge
 Millbrook, Southampton, a district of Southampton, England

United States
 Millbrook, Alabama
 Millbrook, Illinois
 Millbrook, Kansas
 Millbrook, Missouri
 Millbrook, New Jersey
 Millbrook, New York
 Millbrook, North Carolina
 Millbrook, Ohio
 Millbrook, West Virginia
 Millbrook, Wyoming

Other
 Millbrook, common designation for the Hitchcock Estate in Millbrook, New York, associated with Timothy Leary
 Millbrook Commonwealth Action Programme, a programme of the Commonwealth of Nations agreed at Millbrook Resort
 Millbrook (Crewe, Virginia), listed on the National Register of Historic Places in Nottoway County, Virginia
 Millbrook High School (disambiguation)
 Millbrook, Indiana, fictional town in the 2005 film A History of Violence
 Millbrook Primary School, Grove, Oxfordshire, England
 Millbrook, Toowoomba, a heritage house in Queensland, Australia
 Millbrook Winery, a winery and restaurant at Jarrahdale, in the Perth Hills wine region of Western Australia
 Millbrook Press, an American children's book publisher

See also
 Mill Brook (disambiguation)
 Molenbeek (disambiguation)